The 2017–18 NIFL Premiership (known as the Danske Bank Premiership for sponsorship reasons) was the 10th season of Northern Ireland's highest national football league in this format since its inception in 2008, the 117th season of Irish league football overall, and the fifth season of the league operating as part of the Northern Ireland Football League. The season began on 11 August 2017 and concluded on 28 April 2018, with the play-offs taking place in May 2018. 

Linfield were the defending champions from the previous season. On 28 April 2018, Crusaders won the title on the final day of the regular season, defeating Ballymena United 2–1 at the Ballymena Showgrounds to win the league title for the third time in four seasons.

Crusaders qualified for the 2018–19 UEFA Champions League. The runners-up (and 2017–18 Irish Cup winners), Coleraine, along with third-placed Glenavon and the play-off winners, Cliftonville, all qualified for the 2018–19 UEFA Europa League.

Teams
Twelve teams competed in the 2017–18 NIFL Premiership. Portadown were relegated after finishing bottom of the 2016–17 NIFL Premiership and were replaced by Warrenpoint Town as the winners of the 2016–17 NIFL Championship.

Carrick Rangers finished second from bottom but retained their Premiership place after winning the promotion-relegation play-off against NIFL Championship promotion play-off winners Institute 5–2 on aggregate.

Stadia and locations

League table

Results

Matches 1–22
During matches 1–22 each team plays every other team twice (home and away).

Matches 23–33
During matches 23–33 each team will play every other team for the third time (either at home, or away).

Matches 34–38
During matches 34–38 each team will play every other team in their half of the table once. As this is the fourth time that teams play each other this season, home sides are chosen so that they will have played each other twice at home and twice away.

Section A

Section B

Play-offs

UEFA Europa League play-offs
As 2017–18 Irish Cup winners, Coleraine, finished as league runners-up, their original runners-up berth in the Europa League was redistributed to third-placed Glenavon. As a result, the four teams finishing 4th–7th took part in Europa League play-offs to decide which one team would qualify for the 2018–19 UEFA Europa League first qualifying round.

Semi-finals

Final

Cliftonville were the UEFA Europa League play-off winners, and qualified for the 2018–19 UEFA Europa League first qualifying round.

NIFL Premiership play-offs

Pre-play-off

The runners-up and third-placed teams from the Championship were set to take part in a promotion pre-play-off match to decide which team would face the eleventh-placed Premiership team, Carrick Rangers, in the play-off for a place in next season's Premiership. However, as the third-placed Championship team, Harland and Wolff Welders did not apply for a Premiership licence, the second-placed team, Newry City advanced directly to the play-off.

Play-off

The eleventh-placed team from the Premiership, Carrick Rangers, played Championship runners-up, Newry City, over two legs for a place in the 2018–19 NIFL Premiership.

Newry City won 6–3 on aggregate and were promoted to the NIFL Premiership with Carrick Rangers dropping down into the NIFL Championship.

Top goalscorers

References

External links

NIFL Premiership seasons
Northern Ireland
2017–18 in Northern Ireland association football